Broad Hollow Run is a tributary of Bowman Creek in Wyoming County, Pennsylvania, in the United States. The surficial geology in the vicinity of the stream consists of alluvium, alluvial fan, and Wisconsinan Till. Its watershed is designated as a High-Quality Coldwater Fishery and a Migratory Fishery.

Course
Broad Hollow Run begins in a deep valley in Noxen Township. It flows north-northwest for several hundred feet before turning north-northeast and north for a few tenths of a mile. In this reach, the valley of the stream becomes much shallower on one side. The stream then turns north-northeast again. Several tenths of a mile further downstream, it enters the valley of Bowman Creek and reaches its confluence with Bowman Creek.

Geography and geology

The surficial geology near the mouth of Broad Hollow Run consists of alluvium (which contains stratified sand, silt, gravel, and some boulders) and a till known as Wisconsinan Till. Further upstream, the surficial geology consists of Wisconsinan Till and alluvial fan, some of which is underlain by glacial lake clays. The surficial geology at the headwaters consists entirely of Wisconsinan Till.

Broad Hollow Run is in the vicinity of the North Mountain region.

Hydrology and watershed
The stream is entirely within the United States Geological Survey quadrangle of Noxen. Its mouth is located near Stull.

Broad Hollow Run attains the requirements for use by aquatic life.

History
Broad Hollow Run was entered into the Geographic Names Information System on August 2, 1979. Its identifier in the Geographic Names Information System is 1198477.

Biology
The drainage basin of Broad Hollow Run is designated as a High-Quality Coldwater Fishery and a Migratory Fishery. Wild trout naturally reproduce in the stream from its headwaters downstream to its  mouth.

See also
Baker Run, next tributary of Bowman Creek going downstream
Sugar Run (Bowman Creek), next tributary of Bowman Creek going upstream
List of rivers of Pennsylvania
List of tributaries of Bowman Creek

References

Rivers of Wyoming County, Pennsylvania
Tributaries of Bowman Creek
Rivers of Pennsylvania